Series Four of Ninja Warrior UK, a British physical obstacle assault course game show, began airing on 14 April 2018. Unlike previous series, it was announced on 28 August 2017 that the competition would feature a selection of celebrity contestants, including Gethin Jones, Harry Judd, Jenni Falconer and Marvin Humes.

Series Overview

Qualifier
In the course of the four qualifier rounds, the contestants faced a variety of different obstacles in each round, alongside Floating Steps and Warped Wall. The most common featured included Jump Hang - this series saw a few new variations on the obstacle - Floating Steps, and Log Runner - this obstacle was new for this series. This series saw the introduction of new obstacles used on the course - Rope Climb, Floating Steps, Tick Tock and Bar Hop

Qualifier 1 Results

Qualifier 2 Results

Qualifier 3 Results

Qualifier 4 Results

Semi-finals
For the semi-finals of this series, the semi-finalists had to complete Stage 1 of the course within three minutes. Alongside the Floating Steps and Warped Wall, they also had to contend with Ring Swing, Broken Bridge, Bar Hop, and Wind Chimes. Upon completing the stage, they then faced the obstacles of Stage 2, consisting of Ring Slider, Spinning Log, and Rope Climb.

Semi-Finals Results

Final

Final 1 Results

Final 2 Results

Ratings

References

2018 British television seasons
Ninja Warrior UK